A community school in the Republic of Ireland is a type of secondary school funded individually and directly by the state. Community and comprehensive schools were established in the 1960s to provide a broad curriculum for all the young people in a community. Both academic and vocational programmes are available and facilities are broader than at voluntary or vocational schools. The facilities are for use by the community and adult education in addition to normal programmes of education at this level.

Many of these schools were established as the result of an amalgamation of voluntary secondary and vocational schools. They offer a wide range of both academic and vocational subjects. Community schools are managed by boards of management which are representative of local interests. The schools are financed entirely by the Department of Education and Skills. The representative body for these schools is the Association of Community and Comprehensive Schools.

List of community schools in Ireland 

 Ardee Community School
 Ashbourne Community School
 Athboy Community School
 Bailieborough Community School
 Ballinamore Community School
 Balincollig Community School
 Ballinrobe Community School
 Ballinteer Community School
 Ballyhaunis Community School
 Beara Community School
 Beaufort Community School 
 Bishopstown Community School
 Blackwater Community School
 Blakestown Community School
 Boyne Community School
 Cabintreely Community School
 Carndonagh Community School
 Carrigaline Community School
 Cashel Community School
 Castlerea Community School
 Celbridge Community School
 Douglas Community School
 Dunmore Community School
 Gallen Community School
 Glanamaddy Community School
  Glanmire Community School
 Gorey Community School
 Gort Community School
 Hartstown Community School
 Heywood Community School
 Holy Child Community School
 Holy Family Community School
 John the Baptist Community School
 Kildare Town Community School
 Killinarden Community School
 Kilrush Community School
 Kinsale Community School
 Leixlip Community School
 Loreto Community School
 Malahide Community School
 Mayfield Community School
 Millstreet Community School
 Moate Community School
 Mountmellick Community School
 Mountrath Community School
 Moyne Community School
 Old Bawn Community School
 Portmarnock Community School
 Portumna Community School
 Ramsgrange Community School
 Roscommon Community School
 Rosmini Community School
 Rosses Community School
 Scoil Mhuire Community School
 Skibbereen Community School
 St Aidan's Community School
 St Attracta's Community School
 St. Caimin's Community School
 St Ciaran's Community School
 St Louis Community School
 St Marks Community School
 St Peter's Community School
 St Wolstan's Community School
 St. Kilian's Community School
 St. Tiernan's Community School
 St. Brendan's Community School
 Tallaght Community School
 The Donahies Community School
 Tullow Community School
 Kenmare Community School

See also 

 Education in the Republic of Ireland

References 

School types
Secondary education in Ireland